William Henry Joseph Bonaparte Bertholf Smith (November 23, 1893 – April 18, 1973), nicknamed "The Lion", was an American jazz and stride pianist.

Early life
William Henry Joseph Bonaparte Bertholf, known as Willie, was born in 1893 in Goshen, New York. His mother and grandmother chose his names to reflect different parts of his heritage: Joseph after Saint Joseph (Bible), Bonaparte (French), and Bertholf (biological father's last name). William and Henry which were added for "spiritual balance". When he was three, his mother married John Smith, and Smith was added as the boy's surname, after his stepfather.

In his memoir Smith reports that his father, Frank Bertholf (incorrectly spelled Bertholoff in many sources), was Jewish. Smith's New York birth record shows him as William H. Bertholf, with father, Frank Bertholf, a white electrician from nearby Monroe, New York. Smith became at least somewhat conversant in Yiddish and studied Hebrew with children of a Jewish family who were clients of his mother's. He made his bar mitzvah at age thirteen in Newark.

His mother, Ida Oliver, had "Spanish, Negro, and Mohawk Indian blood". Her mother, Ann Oliver, was a banjo player and had been in Primrose and West minstrel shows (Smith also had two cousins who were dancers in the shows, Etta and John Bloom). According to Ida, "Frank Bertholoff [sic] was a light-skinned playboy who loved his liquor, girls, and gambling." She threw Frank out of the house when their son Willie was two years old. After Frank Bertholf died in 1901, his mother married John Smith, a master mechanic from Paterson, New Jersey. When Willie was three, his mother and stepfather added the surname Smith to his legal name. He grew up in a large family with his mother and stepfather in Newark, New Jersey at 76 Academy Street.

John Smith worked for C.M. Bailey, Pork Packers, and he would leave the house around midnight to pick up freshly killed pigs and take them to the packing house. He was supposed to be home by 4 am, but would usually go to bars after work. Eventually, Ida tasked the boy Willie with accompanying his stepfather to work in order to encourage him to come straight home and not go drinking. Willie said he enjoyed this task, but most of the time he had to drive the horses home. He only worked on Fridays and Saturdays, as his mother did not want him to miss school.

He later wrote in his memoir about being at the slaughterhouse with his stepfather:

 I couldn't stand to see what I saw at the slaughterhouse. I would watch wide-eyed as the squealing pigs slid down the iron rails to the cutter where they were slashed through the middle, with the two halves falling into a tank of hot water. The kill sometimes went to as many as four hundred pigs a night. It was a sickening sight to watch. But the cries from the pigs brought forth an emotional excitement. It was another weird but musical sound that I can still hear in my head. The squeaks, the squeals, the dipping them in hot water, they put them on a hook, take off the head, the legs, going down an aisle—I hear it on an oboe. That's what you hear in a symphony: destruction, war, peace, beauty, all mixed.

In 1907, the family moved to 90 Bloome Street in Newark. They moved again around 1912, when his stepfather got a new job at Crucible Steel Company, across the Passaic River in Harrison, New Jersey. The job paid more, and Willie was assigned to get him away from work before his bosses got him drunk on his own money.

He attended the Baxter School, rumored to be a school for bad children. The school was notorious for brawls among the ethnic Irish, Italian, and African-American children. One day Willie was in Mrs. Black's fruit store and was caught with his hand in her register. According to his memoir, Smith had  wanted to borrow a dime to see S.H. Dudley's traveling road show at Blaney's Theater. The owner shocked Willie by turning him over to the police. Mrs. Black's son-in-law was the number three tough guy in Newark; reportedly the family hated policemen and generally wouldn't allow them into their store. Willie was charged in children's court and sentenced to a ten dollar fine and probation.

After that incident, he was transferred to Morton School (which had a lot less brawling), and began sixth grade. He attended Barringer High School (then known as Newark High School). In an effort to get the attention of girls, he attempted a variety of sports, including swimming, skating, track, basketball, sledding, cycling, and boxing. He learned to swim in the Morris Canal.

Prizefighting was the sport he was most interested in. Smith has said that "maybe that because I've known most of the great fighters from way back. They liked to visit the night clubs ... ". He got to kid around with Jack Johnson, Jack Dempsey, Battling Siki, Kid Chocolate, Sam Langford, Joe Gans, Bob Fitzsimmons, Harry Greb, Joe Louis, and Gene Tunney. Fitzsimmons owned a saloon on Market Street in Newark. It was where Smith learned about Stanley Ketchel, Kid McCoy, Benny Leonard, Jimmy Britt, and Charlie Warner.

Smith also joined a gang; their club was called The Ramblers (two members were Abner Zwillman and Niggy Rutman). He was one of two African Americans in the gang; the other was Louis Moss, who Smith called a "sweet talker, who could take his foes apart". Moss later became known as "Big Sue" and owned a saloon in the Tenderloin, Manhattan. Moss acted as his own bouncer at his club (according to Smith, Moss was 6'4" and about 240 pounds). Smith used to play piano in his back room to help him out.

Music career
When Willie was about six, he discovered an organ in the basement, which his mother used to play. It had deteriorated and nearly half the keys were missing. After his mother saw he was interested in it, she taught him the melodies she knew. One of the first songs he learned was Home! Sweet Home!. His uncle Rob, a bass singer who ran his own quartet, taught Willie how to dance. The boy entered an amateur dance contest at the Arcadia Theater and won first place, including a prize of ten dollars. After that, he focused more on playing music at the clubs.

Willie had wanted a new piano very badly, but every time he thought his mother was able to afford it, there was a new mouth to feed. Willie got a job at Hauseman's Footwear store shining shoes and running errands, where he was paid five dollars a week. "Old Man" Hauseman paid that much because he was pleased that Willie could speak Yiddish and also because Willie wanted to buy a piano with the money. As it turned out, piano sellers Marshall & Wendell's was holding a contest: the object was to guess how many dots there were in a printed circle in their newspaper advertisement. Willie used arithmetic to help guess the number, won, and was delivered an upright piano the next day. He played the piano from then on.  He would play songs he heard in the clubs, including Maple Leaf Rag by Scott Joplin, Cannonball Rag by Joe Northrup, Black and White Rag by George Botsford, and Don't Hit that Lady Dressed in Green, about which he said "the lyrics to this song were a sex education, especially for a twelve year old boy.". His other favorites picked up from the saloons were She's Got Good Booty and Baby, Let Your Drawers Hang Low.

By the early 1910s, he was playing at clubs in New York City and Atlantic City, New Jersey. Smith served in World War I, where he saw action in France. He also played drum with the African-American regimental band led by Tim Brymn, and basketball with the regimental team. Legend has it that his nickname "The Lion" came from his reported bravery while serving as a heavy artillery gunner. He was a decorated veteran of the 350th Field Artillery, a regiment of the Buffalo Soldiers.

Around 1915, he married Blanche Merrill (née Howard). Smith and Merrill are thought to have separated before Smith joined the army in 1917, where he served as a corporal. But they were listed in the 1920 census as living together in Newark, New Jersey. Merrill was white, and Smith was the only man in their apartment building who was classified as black on this census.

He returned to working in Harlem clubs and at "rent parties". Smith and his contemporaries James P. Johnson and Fats Waller developed a new, more sophisticated piano style later called "stride".

In the 1940s, his music found appreciation with a wider audience. Smith toured North America and Europe up to 1971. To leave the US, he needed a birth certificate. He went to the Orange County Courthouse and found it, but discovered that the birth certificate said he was born on November 25, in contradiction to his mother telling him he was born on November 23.

Personal life
Smith had 10 brothers and a sister (including half-siblings). His older brother Jerome died at the age of 15. His other older brother, George, became an officer in Atlantic City, and died in 1946. Willie said of George: "Our paths didn't cross very often in later life. His friends and connections were always on the other side of the fence from mine." His half-brother Robert owned a bar on West Street in Newark. His half-brother Melvin lived on Mulberry Street in Manhattan. Smith had no idea what became of his other two half-brothers, Norman and Ralph. His other siblings died as children, ranging from ages of three to seven.

As a boy, Smith delivered clean clothes to his mother's clients, who included a prosperous Jewish family who invited him to sit in on Hebrew lessons on Saturday mornings. Willie made his bar mitzvah in Newark at age thirteen. Later in life he worked as a Hebrew cantor for a congregation in Harlem.

Death
In his later years, he received frequent honors for his life's work including a Willie "The Lion" Smith Day in Newark, New Jersey. Smith died at the age of 79 on April 18, 1973, in New York.

Legacy
The liner notes his 1958 LP The Legend of Willie "The Lion" Smith (Grand Awards Records GA 33-368) state: "Duke Ellington has never lost his awe of the Lion's prowess." It quotes Ellington as saying, "Willie The Lion was the greatest influence of all the great jazz piano players who have come along. He has a beat that stays in the mind." This LP's cover, features a painting of the Lion by Tracy Sugarman. Ellington attested to his admiration when he composed and recorded "Portrait of the Lion" in 1939.

Orange County (NY) Executive Edward Diana issued a proclamation declaring September 18 Willie "The Lion" Smith Day in Orange County, the date of the first Goshen Jazz Festival.

Discography
 Accent On Piano (Urania, 1957)
 The Lion Roars (Dot, 1958)
 The Legend of Willie "the Lion" Smith (Grand Award, 1959)
 Luckey & the Lion: Harlem Piano (Good Time Jazz, 1960)
 Memorial (Vogue, 1960)
 Piano Solos by Willie Smith, the Lion of the Piano: Original Compositions (Commodore, 1961)
 Piano Solos by Willie Smith, the Lion of the Piano: Show Time (Commodore, 1962)
 A Legend (Mainstream, 1965)
 Music On My Mind (SABA, 1966)
 The Lion (Vogue, 1966)
 Grand Piano: Virtuoso Duets by Willie Smith & Don Ewell (Swaggie, 1966)
 Willie the Lion and His Washington Cubs (Fat Cat's Jazz, 1971)
 Willie "the Lion" Smith (GNP Crescendo, 1972)
 Pork and Beans (Polydor, 1972)
 Dixieland All Stars (Roulette, 1973)
 Live at Blues Alley (Chiaroscuro, 1973)
 Relaxing (Chiaroscuro, 1977)

See also
List of ragtime composers

Notes

References

External links
 Willie Smith recordings at the Discography of American Historical Recordings.

1893 births
1973 deaths
20th-century American composers
20th-century American pianists
20th-century jazz composers
African-American Jews
African-American jazz composers
African-American jazz pianists
Barringer High School alumni
Jewish American jazz composers
Jewish American musicians
Jewish jazz musicians
People from Goshen, New York
Ragtime composers
Stride pianists
Vaudeville performers
Jazz musicians from New York (state)
American male pianists
American male jazz composers
American jazz composers
20th-century American male musicians
Sackville Records artists
Good Time Jazz Records artists
American people of Mohawk descent
20th-century African-American musicians
20th-century American Jews